July 7th Residences ( – Mojtame`-ye Meskūnī-ye Haftam Tīr) is a village in Garkan Rural District, Garkan-e Jonubi District, Mobarakeh County, Isfahan Province, Iran. At the 2006 census, its population was 341, in 93 families.

References 

Populated places in Mobarakeh County